Patrick Jones Sparrow (1802 – November 10, 1867) was the eighth President of Hampden–Sydney College from 1845 to 1847.

Biography
Sparrow was born in 1802 in Lincoln County, North Carolina and educated at Bethel Academy in South Carolina After his formal education, in 1824, he became Principal of Lincolnton Male Academy, and was pastor of Presbyterian Church at that place. Sparrow continued studying languages and in 1826 secured a license to preach at Long Creek Church in Cleveland County. In 1836 Sparrow became an agent for Davidson College in securing funds, and in 1837 was elected Professor of Languages at the College.

In 1841 he became pastor of the Presbyterian church in Hampden Sydney, Virginia (College Church). In 1840 he was elected as a trustee of Hampden–Sydney and shortly afterwards was elected President of the College. In July 1847, ten Trustees held a secret meeting apart from a typical full one (of the 26 total trustees) and resolved to ask for Sparrow's resignation because of "evidence that your administration is not acceptable to the public on which we rely for patronage"; the nature of the evidence and of the alleged dissatisfaction is still not known to this day. At the regular September trustee meeting the majority of the Board repudiated the request; however, Sparrow quite understandably resigned, effective immediately and spent the remainder of his life in obscure pastorates in Alabama.

References

1802 births
1867 deaths
Presidents of Hampden–Sydney College
Presbyterian Church in the United States of America ministers
People from Lincoln County, North Carolina
19th-century American clergy